Cambridge Township may refer to the following places:

In Canada:
 Cambridge Township, Ontario

In the United States:
 Cambridge Township, Henry County, Illinois
 Cambridge Township, Michigan
 Cambridge Township, Isanti County, Minnesota
 Cambridge Township, Saline County, Missouri
 Cambridge, New Hampshire, a township
 Cambridge Township, Guernsey County, Ohio
 Cambridge Township, Crawford County, Pennsylvania

Township name disambiguation pages